The Azizabad airstrike was carried out by the United States Air Force on Friday 22 August 2008 in the village of Azizabad which is located in Shindand district, Herat Province, Afghanistan.  The airstrike killed an estimated 33 to 92 civilians, mostly children, and a number of structures in the village including homes were damaged or destroyed, although there remains some dispute about the accuracy of these figures. A Taliban commander was the intended target of the airstrike.

Summary of events
American officials stated that Afghan soldiers were ambushed while in pursuit of a Taliban commander named Mullah Siddiq, and further stated that the Taliban attackers then fled to Azizabad. The retaliatory airstrike killed approximately 90 people and destroyed eight homes, according to accounts from the American troops, aid workers, local villagers, and a report made by the Afghanistan government. This was later confirmed by the United Nations Assistance Mission in Afghanistan (UNAMA) which also undertook an investigation. The attack was carried out at night by a US AC-130 ground attack aircraft, called in by US Special Forces.

Reaction

Azizabad residents
The day after the attack, Saturday 23 August 2008, villagers organised a demonstration against Afghan troops which had been deployed to Azizabad to distribute food and other assistance. Several people were injured during a confrontation between villagers and army personnel.

Government of Afghanistan
The President of Afghanistan, Hamid Karzai, described the attack as "tragic" and "irresponsible". Karzai dismissed two senior Afghan military personnel, a general and a major, for "negligence and concealing facts". After a cabinet meeting the government announced that it would seek to renegotiate the terms of the international presence in the country. Some analysts suggested that this announcement was a direct response to the Azizabad event. A government statement called for an end to "airstrikes on civilian targets, unilateral searches of homes and illegal detentions" by international forces.

In February 2009, a primary court in Herat sentenced Mohammad Nader to death for giving "wrong information" to coalition forces which resulted in the Azizabad airstrike.  The presiding judge, Qazi Mukaram, told Nader that, "You, Mohammad Nader, are sentenced to capital punishment for spying for foreign forces and giving wrong information that caused the death of civilians."  Nader denied the charges, saying, "My information was accurate and I did it for the well-being and security of my village."

Government of United States
The Pentagon described the attack as "a legitimate strike against the Taliban" and questioned the casualty estimates given by the government of Afghanistan and reported by the media. The US military originally denied that any civilian casualties had occurred, but later acknowledged that some civilians may have been killed and announced its intention to conduct an investigation. Preliminary findings of the investigation acknowledged that five civilians had been killed. On 2 September 2008, a further report was announced in which the US stated that up to seven civilians had been killed and reasserted that the majority of those killed were members of the Taliban. On 1 October 2008 the Department of Defense published the summary of a report by Brig. Gen. Michael Callan which accepted that 33 civilians were killed.

United Nations
In a statement on the attack, the United Nations reports that "An investigation by the United Nations Assistance Mission in Afghanistan (UNAMA) has found that some 90 civilians, including 60 children, were among those killed during military operations in the strife-torn nation's western Herat province last week." The investigation found "'convincing evidence, based on the testimony of eyewitnesses, and others,' that some 90 civilians were killed – including 60 children, 15 women and 15 men – and another 15 villagers wounded."

Other international reaction 
Russia circulated a draft United Nations Security Council statement on Tuesday 26 August which expressed serious concern about the numerous civilian casualties reportedly caused by the airstrike. It stated that member nations "strongly deplore the fact that this is not the first incident of this kind."

Video emerges that show more than 40 bodies 

On 8 September 2008, a video recorded on a mobile phone emerged, showing around 40 bodies. Following the emergence of this new evidence, the United States  announced the need for an independent enquiry into the matter. An Afghan government commission stated that 90 civilians, including 60 children and 15 women, died in the bombing. General David D. McKiernan, the senior U.S. officer in Afghanistan and NATO commander, said in a statement "In light of emerging evidence pertaining to civilian casualties in the August 22 counter-insurgency operation in the Shindand District, Herat province, I feel it is prudent to request that U.S. Central Command send a general officer to review the U.S. investigation and its findings with respect to this new evidence".

Possible deaths of coalition contractors
The New York Times reported on October 7, 2010, that eight coalition security contractors were killed in the attack.  The contractors were alleged to be headed by a 'Mr. White II' whose men included former Taliban fighters.

See also
 Granai airstrike
 Sangin airstrike
 Uruzgan helicopter attack
 Haska Meyna wedding party airstrike
 List of massacres in Afghanistan

References

External links

 Videos show dead Afghan children after US raid in Azizabad
 Afghans will dig up graves to prove civilian deaths - Images
 In memory of 91 innocent Afghans massacred by US troops in Azizabad - The names of the victims
 Afghanistan: Investigate Any Newly Disclosed Civilian Casualty Incidents Human Rights Watch, July 26, 2010

2008 in Afghanistan
War in Afghanistan (2001–2021) casualties
Civilian casualties in the War in Afghanistan (2001–2021)
Airstrikes during the War in Afghanistan (2001–2021)
Battles of the War in Afghanistan (2001–2021) involving the United States
History of Herat Province
August 2008 events in Asia
Attacks in Afghanistan in 2008
2008 airstrikes